Pascale Fontenel-Personne (born 26 May 1962) is a French politician who has been serving as a member of the French National Assembly since 2017 to 2022, representing the department of Sarthe. From 2017 until 2019, she was a member of La République En Marche! (LREM).

Political career
Fontenel-Personne was elected in Sarthe's 3rd constituency at the 2017 legislative election.

In parliament, Fontenel-Personne served as member of the Defense Committee. In addition to her committee assignments, she was a member of the French-Montenegrin Parliamentary Friendship Group. From 2019, she was also a member of the French delegation to the Franco-German Parliamentary Assembly.

In July 2019, Fontenel-Personne decided not to align with her parliamentary group's majority and became of 52 LREM members who abstained from a vote on the French ratification of the European Union’s Comprehensive Economic and Trade Agreement (CETA) with Canada.

In late 2019, Fontenel-Personne was one of 17 members of the Defense Committee who co-signed a letter to Prime Minister Édouard Philippe in which they warned that the 365 million euro ($406 million) sale of aerospace firm Groupe Latécoère to U.S. fund Searchlight Capital raised “questions about the preservation of know-how and France’s defense industry base” and urged government intervention.

See also
 2017 French legislative election

References

1962 births
Living people
Deputies of the 15th National Assembly of the French Fifth Republic
La République En Marche! politicians
21st-century French women politicians
Place of birth missing (living people)
Women members of the National Assembly (France)